Alexandre Blain (born 7 March 1981 in Nice) is a French former road bicycle racer, who now works as a directeur sportif for UCI Continental team .

He started cycling for his local mountain bike club in his hometown of Peillon in 1997, riding in downhill mountain biking before switching to cross-country. In November 2015 he was announced as a member of the  squad for 2016.

Major results

2005
 1st Stage 4 Volta a Lleida
2006
 2nd Points race, National Track Championships
2007
 1st Overall Tour du Loir-et-Cher
 1st Boucles Catalanes
 1st Stage 2 Tour de Gironde
 1st Stage 5 Ronde de l'Oise
 6th Overall Les 3 Jours de Vaucluse
2008
 7th Châteauroux Classic
 8th Grand Prix de Denain
2010
 10th East Midlands International CiCLE Classic
2011
 1st Overall Tour de Normandie
1st Stage 7
 3rd Tallinn–Tartu GP
 6th Paris–Bourges
 7th Druivenkoers Overijse
 9th Tro-Bro Léon
2012
 1st Maldon Dengie Tour
 1st Rutland–Melton CiCLE Classic
 3rd Overall Mi-Août Bretonne
 3rd Beverbeek Classic
 4th Omloop van het Waasland
 7th Tartu GP
2013
 2nd Overall Tour de Normandie
1st  Points classification
1st Stage 3
2014
 1st Overall British Cycling Elite Circuit Series
5th Otley Grand Prix
5th Stockton Festival of Cycling Criterium
6th Colne Grand Prix
6th Sheffield Grand Prix
8th Beverley Grand Prix
 1st Severn Bridge Road Race
 4th Circuit of the Fens
 5th Stafford GP
 7th Eddie Soens Memorial
2015
 4th Overall Circuit des Ardennes
1st Stage 3 (TTT)
 9th La Roue Tourangelle
2016
 1st Round 10 - Portsmouth, Tour Series
 5th Beaumont Trophy
 7th Rutland–Melton CiCLE Classic

References

External links

French male cyclists
1981 births
Living people
[[Category:Sportspeople from Aix-en-Provence]